Lieutenant Francis Anthony Blair Fasson,  (17 July 1913 – 30 October 1942), known as Tony Fasson, was a Royal Navy officer. He was posthumously awarded the George Cross "for outstanding bravery and steadfast devotion to duty in the face of danger" when on 30 October 1942 in action in the Mediterranean Sea he captured codebooks vital for the breaking of the German naval "Shark" Enigma cipher from the sinking .

Biography
Fasson was born in the village of Lanton, Roxburghshire, the son of Francis Hamilton Fasson, a captain of the Scottish Horse, and Lilias Clara Fasson (née Bruce). His uncle Robert Robertson Fasson RN was a commander in the Royal Navy.

Fasson was educated at Jedburgh Grammar School, and entered the Royal Navy on 6 September 1930, serving aboard the battleship  as a midshipman until June 1933. Promoted to acting-sub-lieutenant on 1 September 1933, he attended the Royal Naval College, Greenwich and received promotion to sub-lieutenant on 16 May 1934, before being assigned to the light cruiser  on 5 January 1935.

On 15 September 1935 he was attached to the Royal Air Force with the temporary rank of flying officer to train as a pilot at the No. 1 Flying Training School, RAF Leuchars. He returned to the navy on 16 June 1936 and joined the minesweeping sloop  on 18 July 1936, receiving promotion to lieutenant on 16 September 1936. From 19 April 1937 he served aboard the escort vessel  in the East Indies, before joining the destroyer  as first lieutenant on 5 August 1938.

Fasson was appointed first lieutenant of the destroyer  on 20 July 1939, and saw action in her on 10 April 1940 during the First Battle of Narvik, after which he received a Mention in Despatches.

Death
The crew of the U-559 abandoned their vessel, with 7 dead and 38 survivors.

Fasson and Able Seaman Colin Grazier, along with NAAFI canteen assistant Tommy Brown, jumped from the Petard to the deck of the U-559 and entered the sinking submarine, which had water pouring in through seacocks left open by the Germans. Working in complete darkness, fully aware that the submarine could sink without warning at any time, Fasson and Grazier located documents which Brown carried up to men in a whaler. They continued searching until the submarine suddenly foundered – "sank like a stone,"  drowning Fasson and Grazier; Brown survived. Fasson and Grazier were subsequently awarded the George Cross, while Brown received the George Medal. The awards were published in the London Gazette on 14 September 1943.

The codebooks that Fasson, Grazier, and Brown retrieved were immensely valuable to the code-breakers at Bletchley Park, who had been unable to read U-boat Enigma for ten months. The captured material allowed them to read the cyphers for several weeks, and to break U-boat Enigma thereafter.

Memorials
Fasson is commemorated with plaques at Bedrule Kirk and the Jedburgh British Legion Club, while his George Cross is held by the Scottish National War Museum at Edinburgh Castle.

References

1913 births
1942 deaths
People from the Scottish Borders
People educated at Jedburgh Grammar School
British recipients of the George Cross
Royal Navy recipients of the George Cross
Royal Navy personnel killed in World War II
Royal Navy officers
Royal Navy officers of World War II
World War II espionage
People educated at Stubbington House School
Graduates of the Royal Naval College, Greenwich
Deaths by drowning
Scottish military personnel